Irina Vladimirovna Kiseleva (born 23 July 1967) is a former Soviet modern pentathlete. She won medals at five consecutive World Modern Pentathlon Championships from 1984 through 1988. These included two gold medals and two silver medals in the individual competition. She also two gold medals and one silver medal in the team competition.

References

1967 births
Living people
Soviet modern pentathletes